The Serb Democratic Party ( or СДС/SDS) is a Serb political party in Bosnia and Herzegovina. Its current president is Milan Miličević.

In the parliamentary elections of October 2006, the SDS lost its status as the leading party in Republika Srpska and the main Serb party in Bosnia and Herzegovina to the Alliance of Independent Social Democrats (SNSD), led by the president of Republika Srpska Milorad Dodik. Despite making minor gains in the 2010 and 2014 elections, by 2018 the party had fallen to below 20% of the parliament, the lowest seat standing in its history.

The party is under sanctions from the United States for "failing to arrest and turn over war crimes suspects to an international tribunal." The sanctions prohibit any transfer of funds and material from the United States to the SDS and vice versa. The party is on the list of Specially Designated Nationals and Blocked Persons by the Office of Foreign Assets Control U.S. agency.

History

Establishment
Radovan Karadžić founded the Serb Democratic Party in 1990. The party aimed at unifying the Bosnian Serb community, as Jovan Rašković's Serb Democratic Party did with the Serbs in Croatia, and staying part of Yugoslavia (as the "Third Yugoslavia" with Serbia and Montenegro) in the event of secession by those two republics from the federation.

1991
Throughout September 1991, the SDS began to establish various "Serb Autonomous Regions" throughout Bosnia and Herzegovina. After the Bosnian parliament voted on sovereignty on 15 October 1991, a separate Serb Assembly was founded on 24 October 1991 in Banja Luka, in order to exclusively represent the Serbs in Bosnia and Herzegovina. The following month, Bosnian Serbs held a referendum which resulted in an overwhelming vote in favor of staying in a federal state with Serbia and Montenegro, as part of Yugoslavia. In December 1991, a top-secret document entitled ‘For the organization and activity of organs of the Serbs people in Bosnia-Herzegovina in extraordinary circumstances’ was drawn up by the SDS leadership. This was a centralized program for the takeover of each municipality in the country, through the creation of shadow governments and para-governmental structures through various "crisis headquarters", and by preparing loyal Serbs for the takeover in co-ordination with the Yugoslav People's Army (JNA).

Ideology
Historically, the party had a strong ultranationalist, separatist and Islamophobic ideology. Recently, the party switched from far-right and adopted more moderate conservative views, with some of those views even going in favor of Bosnia and Herzegovina as a whole, and not just the Republic of Srpska. Perhaps one of the greatest promoters of that approach is Dragan Mektić, one of the party's high-ranking officials.

List of presidents

Electoral results

Parliamentary elections

Presidential elections

Positions held
Major positions held by Serb Democratic Party members:

References

External links
Official website

 
Conservative parties in Bosnia and Herzegovina
Serbian irredentism
Nationalist parties in Bosnia and Herzegovina
Political parties in Republika Srpska
Separatism in Bosnia and Herzegovina
Serb political parties in Bosnia and Herzegovina
Serb nationalist parties
National conservative parties
1990 establishments in Bosnia and Herzegovina
Political parties established in 1990